Järvenpään Palloseura (abbreviated JäPS) is a football club from Järvenpää, Finland. It was formed in 1947 and is based at the Järvenpää keskuskenttä.

Background
In six decades JäPS evolved from a small local team into one of Finland's largest football clubs, serving Järvenpää and the surrounding area. JäPS has around 1,000 members, 900 of whom are juniors who participate in the girls and boys teams.

In 1978 and 2001 JäPS progressed through to the Kakkonen (Second Division), the third tier of the Finnish football system, but at the end of each season they were relegated back to the Kolmonen (Third Division).

In 2003 JäPS men's team reached the Pikkufinaali (Small Final) of the Suomen Cup (Finnish Cup), being the best Kolmonen team in the Suomen Cup. The team were rewarded by progressing through to the UEFA Regions' Cup in Bulgaria.

Season to season

Structure
Järvenpään Palloseura runs three men's teams, a men's veterans team, two ladies teams, eleven boys teams and seven girls teams. It organises diverse activities for its young players, including training camps, games and tournaments. It owns 80% of the Fortum Hall, which it uses for football training.

Footnotes

External links
 

Football clubs in Finland
Järvenpää
1947 establishments in Finland